Major General Stephen Joseph Asamoa Otu (23 October 1915 –  23 October 1979) was a former Chief of the Defence Staff of the Ghana Armed Forces. He was the first Ghanaian officer to serve in this capacity.

Career
Stephen Otu volunteered for service in the Gold Coast Regiment of the Royal West African Frontier Force. His service marked him out as a potential officer and, in 1947, he was posted to an Officer Cadet Training Unit (OCTU) in the United Kingdom to undertake a selection course. He passed out successfully and was commissioned on 1 May 1948. A decade later, in 1958, he became one of the original officers of the Ghana Regiment, when the Gold Coast gained its independence.

Initially a Company Commander (Major), he was soon promoted to command a Battalion, as a Lieutenant-Colonel. He continued through the higher ranks until, in October 1962, he became only the second Ghanaian to become the Chief of Army Staff, a position he occupied until July 1965 when the army headquarters became annexed to the Ministry of Defence. In 1961 the remaining British Army personnel left Ghana and Major-General S.J.A. Otu  succeeded Major General Henry Templer Alexander, a British officer on loan, taking overall command as the first Ghanaian officer to become the Chief of Defence Staff of the Republic.

References

Ghanaian soldiers
1979 deaths
1915 births
Chiefs of Army Staff (Ghana)